A Conservative Association (CA) is a local organisation composed of Conservative Party members in the United Kingdom. Every association varies in membership size but all correspond to a parliamentary constituency in England, Wales, Scotland and Northern Ireland. An executive council of officers are elected every year at an annual general meeting who represent electoral wards in their local areas and are designated with specified responsibilities. University Conservative associations are run independently from constituency associations. A major role comes  in the form of fund-raising, campaigning, and the selection of candidates to compete in local and parliamentary elections. The first associations were formed as early as 1832.

Executive councils
The executive boards which are elected every year generally consist of the following officers:
 Chairman
 Deputy Chairman (Membership)
 Deputy Chairman (political)
 Treasurer
 Association Secretary 
 Ward representatives

Associations
There is typically one association in each constituency, although in some areas such as Cumbria, a multi-constituency association has been formed.

There are also associations at some universities including:
Cambridge University Conservative Association
Oxford University Conservative Association
Glasgow University Conservative Association
Nottingham University Conservative Association
University of Aberdeen Conservative and Unionist Association

See also
Constituency Labour Party

References

External links
Official website

 
Organisation of the Conservative Party (UK)
History of the Conservative Party (UK)